The Magritte Award for Best Original Score (French: Magritte de la meilleure musique originale) is an award presented annually by the Académie André Delvaux. It is one of the Magritte Awards, which were established to recognize excellence in Belgian cinematic achievements.

The 1st Magritte Awards ceremony was held in 2011 with Pierre Van Dormael receiving posthumously the award for his work in Mr. Nobody. As of the 2022 ceremony, Vincent Cahay is the most recent winner in this category for his work in Adoration.

Winners and nominees
In the list below, winners are listed first in the colored row, followed by the other nominees.

2010s

2020s

See also

References

External links
 Magritte Awards official website
 Magritte Award for Best Original Score at AlloCiné

2011 establishments in Belgium
Awards established in 2011
Film awards for best score
Original Score